Shuil (also Romanized as Shū’īlThe Place for Living) is a village in Shuil Rural District, Rahimabad District, Rudsar County, Gilan Province, Iran. At the 2006 census, its population was 85, in 28 families.
The main agricultural products including nuts and herbal plants are raised naturally without regular irrigation.
the Village is well-equipped with a large library, Health Department for adjoining villages, playground, school and previously enjoyed a local market and public bathroom which nowadays remains some indication of it with outdated face.
people here mainly were farmer and because large amount of migration to big cities, just about in summer time people rush to enjoy the pleasant mild weather in 2000 meter high.

The prominent and famous persons include Ayatollah Masoumi Eshkevari and two pilots which martyrdom in Holly Defense War.
The focal point in this area is related to JIR Masjid (Downhill Mosque), so that many ancestors beloved about its high dignity and donated as Nazri in response to meet their  heart needs.

References 

Populated places in Rudsar County